Garraf, better known as El Garraf, is a comarca (county) in the province of Barcelona, Catalonia, northern Spain. It is named after the Garraf Massif.

The GR 92 long distance footpath, which roughly follows the length of the Mediterranean coast of Spain, has a staging point at Garraf.

Municipalities

See also
Diari de Vilanova

References

External links 
  
Information about Garraf on the web site of the Generalitat de Catalunya (in Catalan)